The Oʻahu ʻamakihi (Chlorodrepanis flava) is a species of Hawaiian honeycreeper in the family Fringillidae. The male is rich yellow below, sharply contrasted with greenish upper parts. Females are duller and have two prominent wing-bars. It is endemic to the island of Oahu in Hawaii, and is likely the only surviving honeycreeper endemic to the island.

Taxonomy
The Oʻahu ʻamakihi was first named by Andrew Bloxam (as Nectarina flava). He saw it and collected specimens from Oʻahu while in the Hawaiian Islands in 1825 as the naturalist on board HMS Blonde.

The species was formerly placed in the genus Hemignathus but was assigned to  Chlorodrepanis based on the phylogenetic analysis of mitochondrial and nuclear DNA sequences.

Habitat 
It tends to stay in the wetter southern area of Oahu, and in the valley near Wahiawa and Mililani. It can easily be spotted in two major parks, the Honouliuli Preserve, and the Wa'ahila Ridge State Recreation Area. It tends to stay in forest, but has - at least to some extent - adapted to non-native forest types. It will nest and forage in wooded urban areas, but prefers native habitats where koa (Acacia koa) dominates. It mainly occurs at altitudes above , but in some valleys in parts of its range it occurs lower.

Diet 
Due to its bill shape, it is able to scrape off pieces of bark and reach insects that make up all of the protein in its diet. It drinks nectar from ōhia lehua (Metrosideros polymorpha) trees and in rare cases it will use sugar feeders.

Breeding 
The birds pair off during the breeding season, which occurs from mid-December to early March. The female lays one to two eggs. In two weeks the eggs hatch, with the hatchlings covered in brown down feathers. The birds are ready leave the nest three weeks later.

Threats 
It is threatened by habitat loss, introduced predators and avian malaria. Some populations, however, appear to have developed a level of resistance to avian malaria, which might explain its recent expansion into lowland areas where mosquitoes - the vector of this disease - are more common. Overall, it appears far less threatened than several other Hawaiian honeycreeper, as also reflected by its status as vulnerable.

References

External links
Species factsheet - BirdLife International
Videos, photos, and sounds - Internet Bird Collection

Hawaiian honeycreepers
Chlorodrepanis
Biota of Oahu
Endemic birds of Hawaii
Birds described in 1827
Taxonomy articles created by Polbot